In the Name of the Sovereign People is a 1990 Italian historical comedy-drama film written and directed by Luigi Magni. It won the David di Donatello for best costumes.

Plot 
Rome, Papal States, 1849. Pope Pius IX was forced to go to Gaeta, Kingdom of the Two Sicilies, in exile due to the advent of the Roman Republic. A few months later the French troops of general Oudinot and the Austrian ones try to retake Rome, to forcefully impose the restoration of the temporal power, which also a part of the citizens, especially the nobles, want to see restored. In the house of the Marquis Arquati, a papal noble, live his son Eufemio, weak and shy, with his wife Cristina (who married him forced by the family), his daughter Giacinta and the servant-mistress Rosetta. Cristina, a supporter of the republic, has become the lover of Captain Giovanni Livraghi, a Milanese revolutionary, who rushed to the aid of the republicans, and a great friend of the Barnabite friar Ugo Bassi, opposed to temporal power and supporter of the rights of the people, but always faithful to his mission as a priest. Among the insurgent commoners Angelo Brunetti, also known as Ciceruacchio stands out, accompanied by his 12 years old son, Lorenzo. Meanwhile the marquis Eufemio, suddenly falling in love with his wife, whom he sees transfigured by his political passion and by that for Livraghi, is determined to kill his rival, and for this purpose he reaches him, while fighting on the Janiculum, where instead he saves him, killing a Frenchman, that was about to hit him dead. After many clashes, the surviving republican patriots, defeated by foreign troops, leave Rome and head in disorder towards the north. Cristina tries to reach Giovanni, who left with Bassi to join Giuseppe Garibaldi. But Bassi and Livraghi are arrested and sentenced to death, while the woman tries in vain to save her lover, begging for pardon from a powerful prelate who is a friend of hers. Before the execution, Ugo is denied the sacraments, while Giovanni chooses to confess to him. Meanwhile, Eufemio is always looking for his wife, whom he wants to kill to take revenge, but when, after Livraghi's death, he sees her again, everything has changed between them: Cristina now esteems him for his generous gesture on the Janiculum, a gesture that made him risk his life. The couple reunite, and she follows her husband when he decides to fight with the Piedmonteses for the unification of Italy. Meanwhile Ciceruacchio and his son are also shot, while Pope Pius IX returns to reign in Rome.

Cast 
Luca Barbareschi as Giovanni Livraghi
Elena Sofia Ricci as  Cristina Arquati
Alberto Sordi as Marquis Arquati
Nino Manfredi as Angelo Brunetti, also known as Ciceruacchio
Jacques Perrin as Ugo Bassi 
Massimo Wertmüller as Eufemio Arquati
Carlo Croccolo as Carlo Luciano Bonaparte
Serena Grandi as Rosetta
 Elena Berera as  Giacinta Arquati 
Gianni Bonagura as Pius IX
Luigi De Filippo as Monsignor Bedini
Roberto Herlitzka as Giuseppe Gioachino Belli
Gianni Garko as General Nicolas Charles Victor Oudinot
Costantino Meloni as Lorenzo Brunetti
Camillo Milli as The Venetian Priest
Lorenzo Flaherty as The French Officer

References

External links

1990 films
Commedia all'italiana
Films directed by Luigi Magni
Films scored by Nicola Piovani
1990s Italian films